Michael Davis Pratt (born March 10, 1957), known professionally as Jim White, is an American singer-songwriter, visual artist and author.

Early life
White was born in California but moved to Pensacola, Florida at the age of 5. He was deeply influenced in his childhood by the spectacle of Pentecostal religion and gospel music. According to various sources, he has been a ditch digger, a suntan oil salesman, a landscaper, a dishwasher, a fry cook, a fashion model, a fashion photographer, a professional surfer and a New York City cab driver. Before embarking on a music career, White attended film school at New York University. Soon after finishing his lengthy thesis at the university, White entered a self-described "deep hole of sickness and depression and poverty". It was during this period that White began writing songs again after a long hiatus, many of which would appear on his debut album Wrong Eyed Jesus, released by David Byrne's boutique label Luaka Bop.

Musical career and performances

White's live shows, particularly when touring solo, can be characterized as off-beat, blending his playlist with open discussion with the audience, anecdotal storytelling derived from his own life experiences, all of which is typically humorous and insightful, with a deep sense of his feeling for the broken beauty of humanity.

White's albums often feature unlikely collaborations. On Wrong-Eyed Jesus, folk singer Victoria Williams sings on the track "Angel-Land"; British electronica trio Morcheeba produced and played on three tracks on No Such Place alongside Sade keyboardist Andrew Hale, who produced three tracks on the same album. Aimee Mann, Barenaked Ladies, and jazz guitarist Bill Frisell appear on Drill a Hole in That Substrate and Tell Me What You See, which was produced by Joe Henry, Tucker Martine, and Jim White himself. In an interview with David Byrne, White described the making of the album. 

White's 2012 album Where It Hits You marked his first effort after an amicable parting of ways with Byrne's Luaka Bop. The record features guest appearances by members the roots group Olabelle, Terri Binion and Shak Nasty. Where It Hits You was released on the Yep Roc label. 

In 2017 White's album Waffles, Triangles & Jesus came out via the PIAPTK label in the US and Loose in the UK. White was joined by musical group Hog Eyed Man, Holly Golightly, and Cicada Rhythm. 

White's 2020 album Misfit's Jubilee marked a departure from his more solemn introspective previous work, featuring and upbeat collaboration with Belgian recording artists Geert Hellings and Nicolas Rombouts. White's longtime drummer Marlon Patton played drums on Misfit's Jubilee, as he did on White's previous four solo records.

Side projects
In 2003 White appeared as defacto tour guide in the documentary film Searching for the Wrong Eyed Jesus, exploring oral and song traditions of the poor white US south. White appeared alongside writer Harry Crews and musicians Johnny Dowd, The Handsome Family and David Eugene Edwards. Before achieving cult status, the film was featured in festivals around the world, winning Best Documentary at the Seattle Film Festival.

In 2006, Jim White collaborated with Johnny Dowd and Willie B and formed a group called Hellwood; in 2006, the band toured throughout Europe to promote the album Chainsaw of Life. White served as producer and songwriter on a collaboration alongside Tucker Martine and blues singer Linda Delgado on a project titled Mama Lucky. Mama Lucky's first release Permanent Stranger was released February 2009.

In 2010 White created Sounds of the Americans, an experimental collaboration with guitarist Dan Nettles based on the soundtrack they composed for a Juilliard Music School theater production.

Continuing his pattern of alternating between solo projects and collaborations, in 2014 White teamed up with the Packway Handle Band to release the bluegrass hybrid Take It Like A Man, which peaked at #3 on the Billboard bluegrass chart.

White's debut album Wrong Eyed Jesus is considered a minor classic in the Americana genre, and his fan base includes various entertainment luminaries such as David Byrne, Matt Groening, and Vince Gilligan. The song "Wordmule" appeared in the Breaking Bad episode "Blood Money", while "Static on the Radio" appeared in the end credits of El Camino: A Breaking Bad Movie.

Film
2003: Searching for the Wrong-Eyed Jesus
2016: Land by Babak Jalali (actor)
2022: Ragged Heart by Evan McNary (actor)

Visual art exhibits
 "Deep Fried Ephemera", The Douglas Hyde Gallery, Dublin, Ireland July 4 – August 18, 2009
 "Winter at SECCA" Southeastern Center for Contemporary Art, Winston-Salem, NC
 "Crossroads" series, performing with The South Memphis String Band, February 19, 2011
 "Scrapbook of a Fringe Dweller" Ogden Museum of Southern Art, New Orleans LA, Oct.7 – December 15, 2013
 Artist in residence 2015-2018 , Aarhus, Denmark Festuge

Books
"Superwhite! / Wild-Eyed Tree", The Douglas Hyde Gallery, 2009. In conjunction with art exhibit. "Includes autobiographical text, Superwhite (Another True Story), and previously unreleased lyrics by Jim White. Also included are images of the exhibition and photographs by Jim White."

In 2013 White's story "The Bottom" was published in the literary journal Radio Silence, and in 2014, it was awarded the prestigious Pushcart Prize for Short Fiction.

After publishing work in various periodicals over his 20-year musical career, White's debut novel Incidental Contact was released in 2022.

Theater
 Musical Score to "The Americans", a Sam Shepard play (with Dan Nettles), Juilliard School of Music NYC, February 11, 2010

Discography

Albums
1997: Wrong-Eyed Jesus (The Mysterious Tale of How I Shouted)
2001: No Such Place
2004: Drill a Hole in That Substrate and Tell Me What You See
2005: Jim White Presents Music from Searching for the Wrong-Eyed Jesus
2007: Transnormal Skiperoo
2012: Where It Hits You
2017: Waffles, Triangles & Jesus
2020: Misfit's Jubilee

EPs
1997: Gimme 5
2008: A Funny Little Cross to Bear

Collaborations
2006: Hellwood (Jim White, Johnny Dowd, Willie B) Chainsaw of Life
2009: Mama Lucky (Jim White, Tucker Martine, Linda Delgado) Permanent Stranger
2004: Tanakh (Jesse Poe) "Villa Claustrophobia"
2006: Tanakh "Ardent Fevers"
2010: Sounds of the Americans (Jim White, Dan Nettles)
2011: Dare Dukes, Thugs and China Dolls (produced the song "Simon Says")
2011: Producer, Belgian Alt Country band (Stanton)
2011; Sounds of the Americans 
2012: Producer, Skipperdees 
2012: Producer Alex Wright
2014: Jim White v.s The Packway Handle Band (Jim White, Packway Handle Band) The Sawyer Sessions EP 
2015: Jim White v.s The Packway Handle Band (Jim White, Packway Handle Band) Take It Like A Man
2015: Sigmatropic ' Every Soul Is A Boat ' 12' ep [Record Store Day] (vocals & lyrics on ' That Throne in Your Heart ')

References

External links
Official website
Jim White on the Loose Music Website
Jim White on the Yep Roc Website

1957 births
American alternative country singers
American country singer-songwriters
Living people
Luaka Bop artists
Singer-songwriters from California
Guitarists from California
20th-century American singers
21st-century American singers
20th-century American guitarists
21st-century American guitarists